Newtonia is a genus of flowering plants in the subfamily Caesalpinioideae and the Mimosoid clade or tribe. The genus is known from the early Miocene (22 - 21 Ma) of Ethiopia based on compressions of its diagnostic, winged seeds. 

Species are:
 Newtonia aubrevillei (Pellegr.) Keay
 Newtonia buchananii (Baker) G.C.C.Gilbert & Boutique
 Newtonia camerunensis - might belong in Entada
 Newtonia duparquetiana (Baill.) Keay
 Newtonia elliotii (Harms) Keay
 Newtonia erlangeri
 Newtonia glandulifera (Pellegr.) G.C.C.Gilbert & Boutique
 Newtonia grandifolia Villiers
 Newtonia griffoniana (Baill.) Baker f.
 Newtonia hildebrandtii (Vatke) Torre
 Newtonia leucocarpa (Harms) G.C.C.Gilbert & Boutique
 Newtonia paucijuga
 Newtonia zenkeri Harms

References

Further reading
 International Legume Database and Information Service (2005): Genus Newtonia. Version 10.01, November 2005. Retrieved 2008-MAR-31.

 
Fabaceae genera
Taxa named by Henri Ernest Baillon